Morristown is a town in Hanover Township, Shelby County, in the U.S. state of Indiana. The population was 1,218 at the 2010 census.

History
Morristown was platted in 1828 by Samuel Morrison, and named for him. The Morristown post office has been in operation since 1834.

Junction Railroad Depot was listed on the National Register of Historic Places in 1979.

Geography
Morristown is located at  (39.673478, -85.696871).

Demographics

2010 census
As of the census of 2010, there were 1,218 people, 467 households, and 311 families living in the town. The racial makeup of the town was 98.6% White, 0.1% African American, 0.7% Native American, 0.1% Asian, and 0.6% from two or more races. Hispanic or Latino of any race were 1.3% of the population.

There were 467 households, of which 36.2% had children under the age of 18 living with them, 43.0% were married couples living together, 18.0% had a female householder with no husband present, 5.6% had a male householder with no wife present, and 33.4% were non-families. 29.6% of all households were made up of individuals, and 12.3% had someone living alone who was 65 years of age or older. The average household size was 2.41 and the average family size was 2.95.

The median age in the town was 38 years. 24.7% of residents were under the age of 18; 8% were between the ages of 18 and 24; 24.9% were from 25 to 44; 21.4% were from 45 to 64; and 20.9% were 65 years of age or older. The gender makeup of the town was 45.4% male and 54.6% female.

2000 census
As of the census of 2000, there were 1,133 people, 426 households, and 296 families living in the town. The racial makeup of the town was 98.94% White, 0.53% Native American, 0.09% Asian, and 0.44% from two or more races. Hispanic or Latino of any race were 0.53% of the population.

There were 426 households, out of which 38.3% had children under the age of 18 living with them, 55.4% were married couples living together, 10.6% had a female householder with no husband present, and 30.3% were non-families. 27.9% of all households were made up of individuals, and 13.8% had someone living alone who was 65 years of age or older. The average household size was 2.58 and the average family size was 3.12.

In the town, the population was spread out, with 28.0% under the age of 18, 9.1% from 18 to 24, 29.0% from 25 to 44, 18.2% from 45 to 64, and 15.7% who were 65 years of age or older. The median age was 35 years. For every 100 females, there were 89.1 males. For every 100 females age 18 and over, there were 84.6 males.

The median income for a household in the town was $36,417, and the median income for a family was $44,327. Males had a median income of $32,625 versus $23,295 for females. The per capita income for the town was $16,129. About 2.4% of families and 5.5% of the population were below the poverty line, including 5.2% of those under age 18 and 9.7% of those age 65 or over.

Education
Morristown is the location of Morristown Elementary and Morristown Junior-Senior High School.

Morristown has a public library, a branch of the Shelby County Public Library.

References

External links
Town website

Towns in Shelby County, Indiana
Towns in Indiana
Indianapolis metropolitan area